Eckert Building is a historic building in Cincinnati, Ohio. It was listed in the National Register of Historic Places on September 29, 1983.

Description and history
The large multi–story mixed residential/commercial use building sits on a foundation of rock faced limestone in an ashlar pattern capped with a smooth plinth course. The main wall treatment is deep red brick with sandstone belt courses that become ornamented lintels. The lintels vary on each floor. String courses run in line with lug sills. A decorative frontispiece with a glazed brick arch and name plate is on the south facade. It is an example of Queen Anne style architecture in the United States. It is the only example of its kind on the east side of the Cincinnati. It was built for Valentine Eckert, who operated a notions business with his brother Joseph, as an investment property.

See also 
 Historic preservation
 National Register of Historic Places listings in Cincinnati

References

External links 
 * 

National Register of Historic Places in Cincinnati
Buildings and structures in Cincinnati
Queen Anne architecture in Ohio